Still Processing is a Canadian short documentary film, directed by Sophy Romvari and released in 2020. Made as her thesis project while she was pursuing her MFA in film at York University, the film explores her family's unresolved grief over the deaths of her two older brothers through the process of digitizing a box of old films, photographs and undeveloped photographic negatives of them throughout their lives.

The film premiered at the 2020 Toronto International Film Festival.

Critical response
The film was positively reviewed by critics. Adam Nayman of Cinema Scope wrote that "Romvari’s instinct (and ability) to compose beautiful frames as containers around her ideas is of a piece with her previous work, but in Still Processing, the recessive, strategically mediated melancholy of the earlier shorts has been replaced with (or perhaps given way to) a more untrammelled emotional affect," while Alina Faulds of Flipscreen wrote that "Sophy Romvari shows brave filmmaking with her willingness to document her grief on screen. She holds nothing back, telling the viewers about the love she has for her lost brothers and even going so far as to capture one of her panic attacks. Still Processing is a tender portrait of empathy; Romvari grieves forces the audience to grieve along with her. As she visits each photograph and memory she is giving herself permission to heal. Vulnerability is one of the greatest strengths an artist can have and with a film like Still Processing, vulnerability is necessary."

Awards
The film received a Canadian Screen Award nomination for Best Short Documentary at the 10th Canadian Screen Awards in 2022.

References

External links

2020 films
2020 short documentary films
Canadian short documentary films
2020s Canadian films